Nangavalli is a panchayat town in Salem district in the Indian state of Tamil Nadu.

Geography
The town is also notable for its irrigation system constructed by British workers prior to Indian independence, allowing water to be carried only by gravity, along 36 km from Nangavalli to Salem.

Demographics

Population 
At the 2001 Indian census, Nangavalli has a population of 9,610; 52% male and 48% female. Nangavalli has an average literacy rate of 59%, almost exactly the national average of Tamil Nadu; however, the literacy between genders is unbalanced, with male literacy at 67% and female literacy at 49%. 12% of the Nangavalli population is under 6 years of age.

Economy 
The main occupation in Nangavalli is weaving, and its silk sarees are sold across the region.

Culture/Cityscape 
The town celebrates two main festivals, the Narashimha Swamy Thirukovil and the Dhroupathi Amman. Mahabharatha's fight is  recreated in a live show as part of the festival.

Reference 
  
Cities and towns in Salem district